Charlie O'Connell may refer to:

Charlie O'Connell (roller derby) (1935–2015), American roller derby skater
Charlie O'Connell (born 1975), American actor
Charlie O'Connell (footballer) (born 2002), English footballer
Charlie O'Connell (rugby union), New Zealand player in Otago Rugby Football Union

See also
Charles O'Connell (disambiguation)